The Song of Aixa or Aixa's Song (Spanish: La canción de Aixa) is a 1939 German-Spanish musical drama film directed by Florián Rey and starring Imperio Argentina. It is set in Spanish Morocco.

Cast
 Imperio Argentina as Aixa  
 Pedro Barreto 
 Pedro Fernández Cuenca as Ben Darir  
 Anselmo Fernández as Ali  
 Pablo Hidalgo as Maestro  
 Manuel Luna as Abslam 
 Ricardo Merino as Hamed  
 Mari Paz Molinero as Zohira  
 Nicolás D. Perchicot as Amar  
 José Prada as Larbi 
 Rafaela Satorrés as Zaida

References

Bibliography 
 Bentley, Bernard. A Companion to Spanish Cinema. Boydell & Brewer 2008.

External links 
 

1930s musical drama films
German musical drama films
Spanish musical drama films
1939 films
1930s Spanish-language films
Films directed by Florián Rey
Films set in Morocco
Films of Nazi Germany
Spanish black-and-white films
German black-and-white films
1939 drama films
1930s German films